Todd Richardson (born December 26, 1976) is an American politician. A member of the Republican Party, Richardson represented the 152nd district in the Missouri House of Representatives from 2013 to 2019. He is from Poplar Bluff, Missouri. Richardson previously represented Missouri's 154th House district from 2011 to 2013. He was elected Speaker of the Missouri House of Representatives in 2015.

His father Mark served for 12 years as a Republican in the Missouri House of Representatives.  Richardson was named a 2014 Aspen Institute Rodel Fellow.

Richardson resigned his seat in the Legislature in October 2018, a few months before his fourth and final term would have ended in January, 2019. Governor Mike Parson appointed him to serve as the director of MO HealthNet, Missouri's Medicaid program.

Electoral history

References

External links

 

1976 births
21st-century American politicians
Living people
People from Poplar Bluff, Missouri
Speakers of the Missouri House of Representatives
Republican Party members of the Missouri House of Representatives
University of Memphis alumni